Manisha Panwar is an Indian politician from the Indian National Congress and a member of the Rajasthan Legislative Assembly representing the Jodhpur assembly constituency of Rajasthan.

References 

Members of the Rajasthan Legislative Assembly
1980 births
Indian National Congress politicians from Rajasthan
Living people